Kennington is a suburb of Bendigo, a city in Victoria, Australia. The suburb is home to the Kennington Reservoir.

History
Kennington is known for the orphanage called the Convent Of The Good Shepard, Bendigo opened in 1905 next doorA Primary School first principal in 1901.  The Post Office opened on 1 May 1913 and closed in 1972.

References

Suburbs of Bendigo
Bendigo